The 2020 season is Rosenborg's 41st consecutive year in the top flight now known as Eliteserien, their 53rd season in the top flight of Norwegian football. They will participate in Eliteserien, the Cup and Europa League entering at the First Qualifying round. The end of the pre-season and the start of the season were postponed due to the COVID-19 pandemic. After two months, the season was confirmed to start 16 June, with full training starting from 7 May. This was Eirik Horneland's second season as Rosenborg manager, but he was let go after only 3 matches. Trond Henriksen took over as interim manager until Åge Hareide was appointed new manager. Due to the COVID-19 pandemic only 200 fans were allowed in the stadiums the first 20 rounds, while 600 fans were allowed in the remaining 10 rounds.

Squad

Transfers

Winter

In:

Out:

Summer

In:

Out:

Friendlies

Competitions

Eliteserien

Results summary

Results by round

Results

Table

Norwegian Cup

UEFA Europa League

Qualifying rounds

Squad statistics

Appearances and goals

|-
|colspan="14"|Players away from Rosenborg on loan:
|-

|-
|colspan="14"|Players who appeared for Rosenborg no longer at the club:
|-

|}

Disciplinary record

See also
Rosenborg BK seasons

References 

2020
Rosenborg